Bo Geens (born 10 August 1995) is a Belgian professional footballer who plays as a goalkeeper for Belgian Division 3 club FC Wezel Sport.

Career 

Geens joined MVV Maastricht in 2016 on loan from Lokeren. He made his Eerste Divisie debut on 5 August 2016 against Helmond Sport. He played the full game.

Upon his return to Lokeren, however, his chances of playing again faltered. In 2018, Geens moved to Lierse Kempenzonen, where he started the season as the starting goalkeeper. There he eventually fell in the depth chart and was passed by Senne Vits and Thibaut Rausin. During the second half of the 2018–19 season, Lierse Kempenzonen loaned him out to division rivals Eendracht Aalst.

On his return, Geens failed to win the competition with Rausin. After his contract with Lierse Kempenzonen expired at the end of the 2019–20 season, he signed a one-year contract with Dutch Eerste Divisie club TOP Oss on 27 August 2020.

On 2 August 2021, he joined Excelsior for one season.

References

External links

1995 births
Living people
Sportspeople from Mechelen
Footballers from Antwerp Province
Belgian footballers
Belgium youth international footballers
Belgian expatriate footballers
Association football goalkeepers
K.S.C. Lokeren Oost-Vlaanderen players
MVV Maastricht players
Lierse Kempenzonen players
S.C. Eendracht Aalst players
TOP Oss players
Excelsior Rotterdam players
Belgian Pro League players
Eerste Divisie players
Belgian expatriate sportspeople in the Netherlands
Expatriate footballers in the Netherlands